Ridgewood High School may refer to:
 Ridgewood High School (New Jersey), Ridgewood, Bergen County, New Jersey
 Ridgewood High School (Florida), New Port Richey, Pasco County, Florida
 Ridgewood High School (Illinois), Norridge, Illinois
 Ridgewood High School (West Lafayette, Ohio), West Lafayette, Ohio
 Ridgewood High School, Wollaston, Wollaston, West Midlands, UK